Monika Hausammann (born 1974 in Bern) is a Swiss writer and journalist.

Life 
Monika Hausammann grew up in canton Bern in Switzerland and attended grammar school. Her father, Peter Hausammann, was CEO of Espace Media Groupe.

At the age of 17 she went to Paris and lived there on her own for a year. After a long dry spell, she first financed a classic vocational training and then a degree in business administration at a French private university. 10 years in the private sector followed.

In 2016 she wrote her first book, the political thriller The Minister: No Case for Carl Brun. This was followed by the book Der Fonds in 2017 and the novel Das Attentat in 2019. Her last thriller, Ares, was released in October 2020: No case for Carl Brun, a political thriller about the Swiss secret service. The book was discussed and praised in several newspapers, including the Weltwoche and the Berner Zeitung. The German Top Magazine included it in its 6 reading tips for the summer.

Today Hausammann lives in seclusion on a country estate on the French Atlantic coast and, in addition to her novels, writes a monthly column for the liberal authors and debates magazine Schweizer Monat. In the July / August she had the cover of the Schweizer Monat Magazin.
In June 2021 Hausammann joind the swiss Reihnhardt Verlag Group in Basel.

Publications 

 "Ministerin: Kein Fall für Carl Brun, 2016," {{ISBN 978-3-93956243-6.}}
 "Der Fonds: Kein Fall für Carl Brun", LS Verlag, 2017, {{ISBN 978-3-93956277-1}}
 "Das Attentat: Kein Fall für Carl Brun", LS Verlag, {{ISBN 978-3-93956288-7}}
 "Ares: Kein Fall für Carl Brun, LS Verlag, 2020, {{ISBN 978-3-94897102-1}}

References

External links 

 Website
 MuckRack Profil
 Schweizer Monat Author Page

21st-century Swiss novelists
Swiss columnists
21st-century Swiss journalists
Swiss women novelists
1974 births
Living people
Political writers
Swiss writers
Swiss women writers
Thriller writers
Swiss women columnists
Swiss women journalists
Organized crime writers